Laughter Chilembe (born 25 November 1975) is a former Zambian international footballer.

Club career
Chilembe began his senior career in 1998 with Nchanga Rangers before signing for Zimbabwe Premier Soccer League club CAPS United. On Chilembe's return to Zambia, he re-signed for Nchanga Rangers in 2006. Chilembe later signed for Power Dynamos, staying at the club for three seasons. In 2012, Chilembe signed for NAPSA Stars, seeing out his career at the club in 2016.

International career
Chilembe represented Zambia at the 2000 Africa Cup of Nations. Despite two draws in the group stage, including one against Senegal where Chilembe scored, Zambia failed to advance.

International goals
Scores and results list Zambia's goal tally first.

Honours
Nchanga Rangers
Zambian Premier League: 1998

CAPS United
Zimbabwe Premier Soccer League: 2004, 2005
Cup of Zimbabwe: 2004

Power Dynamos
Zambian Premier League: 2011
Zambian Cup: 2009, 2011

NAPSA Stars
Zambian Cup: 2012

References

External links
 

1975 births
Living people
Zambian footballers
Zambia international footballers
Zambian expatriate footballers
Zambian expatriate sportspeople in Zimbabwe
Nchanga Rangers F.C. players
CAPS United players
2000 African Cup of Nations players
2002 African Cup of Nations players
Power Dynamos F.C. players
NAPSA Stars F.C. players
Association football defenders